Hiromi Wajima (born 23 February 1995) is a Japanese kickboxer, currently competing in the super welterweight division of K-1, where he is the current K-1 Super Welterweight champion. He is the finalist of the 2020 K-1 Super Welterweight Grand Prix.

Kickboxing career

K-1
Hiromi began a six fight winning streak with a first round TKO win over Kazunari Kimura. During this run he likewise scored knockouts over Yoichi Yamazaki, Shimada Masayuki and Tanaka Yuki. Wajima won the rematch with Jinbo Katsuya during KHAOS 5, with a second round KO.

Hiromi Wajima had his second professional career loss with a unanimous decision loss to Jordann Pikeur. He suffered his first knockout loss at the hands of Minoru Kimura, losing after only two minutes.

He snapped his losing streak at Krush 108, where Wajima won a unanimous decision against Daisuke Fujimura.

Wajima participated in the 2020 Super Welterweight Grand Prix. In the quarter final bout he faced Avatar Tor Morsri whom he defeated early in the third round with a leg kick knockout. In the semifinals he won a unanimous decision against Yasuhiro Kido. In the grand prix finals he fought a rematch with Minoru Kimura. He would fail to capture the super welterweight title, losing to Kimura for the second time in his career.

Wajima fought Raseasing Weerasakreck during K-1 World GP 2020 in Osaka. He won the fight by a second round KO. He was scheduled to fight Yuhei Fujioka during K-1 World GP 2020 in Tokyo, and won by a second round head kick.

Wajima was scheduled to fight Abiral Ghimire at K-1 World GP 2021 in Fukuoka on July 17, 2021. He won the fight by a third-round technical knockout.

K-1 super welterweight champion
Wajima challenged Minoru Kimura for the K-1 Super Welterweight title at K-1 World GP 2021 in Osaka on December 4, 2021. They previously fought on March 22, 2020, with Kimura winning by a first-round technical knockout. Wajima was more successful in the rematch, winning the fight by a third-round knockout. He began to take over the fight from the beginning of the second round onward, with most of his success coming from body strikes, and finally stopped Kimura with a body kick which left him unable to beat the eight count.

Wajima was booked to face the former RISE welterweight champion BeyNoah at The Match 2022 on June 19, 2022. He won the fight by unanimous decision, with all three judges scoring the bout 30–24 in his favor, as he managed to knock BeyNoah down in every round of the fight.

Wajima faced the former FFC Lightweight (70.3 kg) champion Meletis Kakoubavas in a non-title bout at K-1 World GP 2022 Yokohamatsuri on September 11, 2022. He won the fight by a first-round knockout. The fight was stopped early in the opening round, as Wajima landed an inadvertent low blow on Kakoubavas.

Wajima made his first K-1 Super Welterweight title defense against the four-weight Rajadamnern Stadium champion Jomthong Chuwattana at K-1 World GP 2023: K'Festa 6 on March 12, 2023. The fight was ruled a majority decision draw after the first two rounds, with two judges having scored the bout an even 29–29, while the third judge awarded Wajima a 29–28 scorecard. Wajima won the fight by technical knockout 25 seconds into the extra fourth round.

Championships and accomplishments
Professional
K-1
 2020 K-1 World GP -70kg Championship Tournament Runner-up
 2021 K-1 World GP Super Welterweight Championship
One successful title defense
 2021 K-1 Awards "Skill Award"

Amateur
 2015 K-1 Amateur All Japan A-class Tournament -70kg Winner

Kickboxing record

|-  style="text-align:center; background:#cfc"
| 2023-03-12 || Win ||align=left| Jomthong Chuwattana || K-1 World GP 2023: K'Festa 6 || Tokyo, Japan || TKO (Corner stop./Low kicks) || 4 || 0:25 
|-
! style=background:white colspan=9 |
|-  style="text-align:center; background:#cfc"
| 2022-09-11 || Win || align=left| Meletis Kakoubavas ||  K-1 World GP 2022 Yokohamatsuri  || Yokohama, Japan || KO (Left straight) || 1 || 1:34
|-  style="text-align:center; background:#cfc"
| 2022-06-19 || Win ||align=left| BeyNoah || THE MATCH 2022 || Tokyo, Japan || Decision (Unanimous) || 3 || 3:00
|-  style="text-align:center; background:#cfc"
| 2021-12-04 || Win || align=left| Minoru Kimura || K-1 World GP 2021 in Osaka || Osaka, Japan ||KO (Body kick) || 3 ||2:50
|-
! style=background:white colspan=9 |
|-  style="text-align:center; background:#cfc"
| 2021-07-17|| Win ||align=left| Abiral Himalayan Cheetah|| K-1 World GP 2021 in Fukuoka || Fukuoka, Japan || KO (Low kicks) || 3 || 2:23
|-  style="text-align:center; background:#cfc"
| 2020-12-13|| Win || align=left| Yuhei Fujioka || K-1 World GP 2020 Winter's Crucial Bout|| Tokyo, Japan || KO (High kick) || 1 || 2:03
|-  style="text-align:center; background:#cfc"
| 2020-09-22|| Win || align=left| Raseasing Weerasakreck ||K-1 World GP 2020 in Osaka|| Osaka, Japan || KO (Uppercut) || 2||0:59
|-  style="text-align:center; background:#fbb"
| 2020-03-22|| Loss ||align=left| Minoru Kimura || K-1: K'Festa 3, -70kg Championship Tournament Final || Saitama, Japan || TKO (Corner stoppage)|| 1|| 1:02
|-
! style=background:white colspan=9 |
|-  style="text-align:center; background:#cfc"
| 2020-03-22|| Win ||align=left| Yasuhiro Kido || K-1: K'Festa 3, -70kg Championship Tournament Semi Finals || Saitama, Japan || Decision (Unanimous) ||3 || 3:00
|-  style="text-align:center; background:#cfc"
| 2020-03-22|| Win ||align=left| Avatar Tor.Morsri || K-1: K'Festa 3, -70kg Championship Tournament Quarter Finals || Saitama, Japan || KO (Low kick) ||3 || 0:40
|-  style="text-align:center; background:#cfc"
| 2019-11-16||Win ||align=left| Daisuke Fujimura || Krush 108|| Osaka, Japan || Decision (Unanimous) || 3 || 3:00
|-  style="text-align:center; background:#fbb"
| 2019-03-10|| Loss ||align=left| Minoru Kimura || K-1 World GP 2019: K’FESTA 2 || Saitama, Japan || KO (Left hook) || 1 || 2:20
|- style="text-align:center; background:#fbb"
| 2018-09-30|| Loss ||align=left| Jordann Pikeur || Krush.93 || Tokyo, Japan || Decision (Unanimous) || 3 || 3:00
|-
! style=background:white colspan=9 |
|-  style="text-align:center; background:#cfc"
| 2018-05-26||Win ||align=left| Katsuya Jinbo || KHAOS 5 || Tokyo, Japan || KO (Left hook) || 2 || 2:32
|-  style="text-align:center; background:#cfc"
| 2018-03-03||Win ||align=left| Wang Chao || Wu Lin Feng 2018: World Championship Tianjin  || Tianjin, China || KO (Left cross) || 2 ||
|-  style="text-align:center; background:#cfc"
| 2017-12-27||Win ||align=left| Yoichi Yamazaki || K-1 WORLD GP 2017 JAPAN ～SURVIVAL WARS 2017～ || Tokyo, Japan || KO (Jumping knee) || 3 || 2:06
|-  style="text-align:center; background:#cfc"
| 2017-10-14||Win ||align=left| Masayuki Shimada || KHAOS 4 || Tokyo, Japan || KO (Low kick) || 2 || 2:32
|-  style="text-align:center; background:#cfc"
| 2017-08-20||Win ||align=left| Tanaka Strike Yuki || Krush 79 || Nagoya, Japan || KO (Low kick) || 1 || 2:26
|-  style="text-align:center; background:#cfc"
| 2017-04-22||Win ||align=left| Kazunari Kimura || K-1 World GP 2017 Super Bantamweight Championship Tournament	 || Tokyo, Japan || TKO (Doctor stoppage) || 1 || 1:13
|-  style="text-align:center; background:#fbb"
| 2017-01-15|| Loss ||align=left| Hiroki Nakajima|| Krush 72|| Tokyo, Japan || Decision (Majority) || 3 || 3:00
|-  style="text-align:center; background:#cfc"
| 2016-10-09||Win ||align=left| Ryu Oda || HIGHSPEED 2016 ～higher self～ || Osaka, Japan || KO (Left cross) || 1 || 2:34
|-  style="text-align:center; background:#cfc"
| 2016-07-18||Win ||align=left| Katsuya Jinbo || Krush 67 || Tokyo, Japan || TKO (Punches) || 2 || 2:37
|-  style="text-align:center; background:#cfc"
| 2016-05-22||Win ||align=left| Fumiya Uezono || HIGHSPEED EX || Osaka, Japan || KO (Left cross) || 1 || 0:24
|-
| colspan=9 | Legend:    

|-  style="background:#cfc;"
| 2015-08-15|| Win ||align=left| Masashi Nakajima || K-1 Amateur A-class Challenge -70kg Tournament, Final || Tokyo, Japan || Decision (Unanimous)|| 2 || 2:00 
|-
! style=background:white colspan=9 |
|-  style="background:#cfc;"
| 2015-08-15|| Win ||align=left| Ryunosuke Takahashi || K-1 All Japan Amateur A-class Challenge -70kg Tournament, Semi Final || Tokyo, Japan || KO || 1 ||
|-  style="background:#cfc;"
| 2015-06-21|| Win ||align=left| Ikki Konishi || K-1 All Japan Amateur A-class Challenge -70kg Tournament, Final || Tokyo, Japan || KO || 1 ||
|-  style="background:#cfc;"
| 2015-06-21|| Win ||align=left| Kentaro Ishibashi || K-1 Amateur A-class Challenge -70kg Tournament, Semi Final || Tokyo, Japan || KO || 1 ||
|-  style="background:#cfc;"
| 2015-06-21|| Win ||align=left| Masashi Nakajima || K-1 Amateur A-class Challenge -70kg Tournament, Quarter Final || Tokyo, Japan || KO || 1 ||
|-  style="background:#cfc;"
| 2012-06-17|| Win ||align=left| Yoshinobu Matsushita || KAKUMEI || Osaka, Japan || KO || 2 ||
|-  style="background:#cfc;"
| 2012-04-22|| Win ||align=left| Masahiro Iwata|| KAKUMEI || Osaka, Japan || Decision (Unanimous) || 3 || 2:00
|-  style="background:#cfc;"
| 2011-09-25|| Win ||align=left| Satoshi Yamashita|| KAKUMEI || Osaka, Japan || Decision (Unanimous) || 2 || 1:30
|-  style="background:#cfc;"
| 2011-07-24|| Win ||align=left| Kunio Oohashi || KAKUMEI || Osaka, Japan || KO || 1 ||
|-
| colspan=9 | Legend:

See also
List of male kickboxers

External links
Hiromi Wajima K-1 profile

References 

Japanese kickboxers
1995 births
Living people
Featherweight kickboxers
Japanese male kickboxers
People from Shijōnawate
Sportspeople from Osaka